Bendy and the Ink Machine is an episodic first-person survival horror video game developed and published by Kindly Beast under the name of the game's in-universe animation studio Joey Drew Studios Inc. It was initially released to Game Jolt on February 10, 2017, as the first of five chapters, with a full worldwide release on October 27, 2018. The game was also released for PlayStation 4, Xbox One, and Nintendo Switch on November 20, 2018, being published by Rooster Teeth Games, and for IOS and Android on December 21, 2018.

Inspired by the BioShock game series, the game is set in the fictional Joey Drew Studios. The player controls Henry Stein, a retired animator who receives a letter inviting him 
back to his old workplace. Stein discovers a series of strange paranormal activities caused by the titular Ink Machine. In the game, players navigate through a first person perspective and need to complete certain tasks to proceed, such as combat, collecting objects or solving puzzles. Players can also find audio logs recorded by the studio's employees in order to understand the game's history.

Bendy and the Ink Machine was well-received upon its initial release. Praise centered on its vintage aesthetic and story, although its puzzles and combat mechanics were less popular. In the months following its release, the game quickly gained a large following from exposure on platforms like YouTube and Twitch, and eventually was approved through Steam Greenlight in mid-2017. Merchandise, as well as a mobile spin-off, was later introduced to further promote the game. Mike Mood, the game's programmer and co-creator, described the game as an "accidental success". Bendy and the Dark Revival, the next game in the series, was released on November 15, 2022.

Gameplay
Bendy and the Ink Machine is a first person survival that resembles several cartoons in the 1920s to 1940s. The player plays as Henry Stein, a retired animator who returns to his old workplace, Joey Drew Studios, and discovers that a machine has destroyed the entire studio and brought certain cartoon characters to life. The game mixes combat with puzzle mechanics. Players explore through a first-person view and have limited physical actions such as running and jumping. Different items can be collected, some of which are required to perform various tasks before proceeding. Cans of bacon soup can also be collected for achievements and to restore Henry's health if he is injured.

Combat is primarily focused around a variety of different melee-based weapons, such as an axe, pipe, plunger, wrench, or scythe. Additionally there are long-range weapons such as a tommy gun or bacon soup cans. In-game enemies have different strength levels and resilience to damage, forcing players to be tactical about keeping out of reach and striking when necessary. Failure to do so will result in a death. Henry can retreat inside Little Miracle Stations whenever enemies are nearby in order to recover or remain out of sight. If he takes too much damage, he can escape from the ink that consumes him and respawn at one of the numerous statues of Bendy that act as checkpoints. The player can save their progress by interacting with time card stations.

In addition, players can find numerous audio logs throughout the studio that give more details about the game's story, particularly concerning the fate of the studio and its employees, similar to the systems used in games such as BioShock. Some of these logs can be missed and require further exploration to uncover the secret areas they often reside In. At the final chapter, players unlock the Seeing Tool, which is a device used to view secret hidden messages that would be invisible without it. After completing it, players can also use it in the previous four chapters.

Plot

Chapter 1: Moving Pictures 
In the year 1963, Henry Stein, co-founder and former animator at Joey Drew Studios, is invited back to the studio by his former friend and business partner, Joey Drew. Henry enters the studio and finds it abandoned and dirtied up with ink splotches everywhere, as well as a mutilated, anthropomorphic figure in the form of Boris the Wolf, one of the studio's characters. Henry discovers that the messy ink was caused by the Ink Machine, a device Joey created after Henry had left which Joey intended to use to create real-life versions of the studio's cartoon characters. Henry fixes and turns on the machine by collecting various objects in a ritualistic fashion: a Bendy doll, a wrench, a record, a book, an ink jar, and a gear. After doing so, Henry goes back to the machine, but is attacked by a demon taking an ink-based form of the studio's mascot, Bendy the Dancing Demon. Henry tries to escape, but when he reaches the door, the floor under him gives way and he falls into the studio's lower levels. Walking on to find an exit, Henry drains out the ink to move forward and finds a room with coffins and a pentagram on the floor, the latter of which he steps on, causing him to hallucinate before passing out.

Chapter 2: The Old Song 
Henry wakes up and searches for a way out. He eventually comes to the music department and discovers an exit at the bottom of some stairs, but the stairs are flooded and blocking the door. After battling ink creatures known as Searchers, Henry finds music director Sammy Lawrence's office and finds a pump switch inside that could drain the ink at the stairs, but his office is blocked by a massive ink leak. Henry finds two valves that lower the ink pressure, one of which is held by a Searcher with a hat that he must defeat. At one point, he must learn to play Sammy's favorite song to open a door to reach the second valve. After stopping the leak, Henry drains the ink at the stairs. While approaching the stairs, however, he is knocked out by Sammy, who has turned into an ink humanoid with a Bendy mask. After Henry wakes up, Sammy reveals he intends to sacrifice Henry to Bendy, whom he worships as a deity, so that he can be free of the ink. As Sammy begins the ritual, though, he is attacked by Bendy and presumably killed. Henry breaks free and flees from Bendy into a storage room, locking the door behind him. Venturing into the room, he finds a fully intact Boris the Wolf.

Chapter 3: Rise and Fall 
Henry befriends Boris, and after Henry makes him 3 cans of soup, he gives Henry a lever needed to open the exit. The two leave Boris' safehouse to find another way out of the studio. After using a flashlight to make their way through a dark area, they come across the toy department and find a back room full of merchandise for Alice Angel, the studio's lead female. After Boris is briefly separated from Henry, he gives him a Gent pipe to use as a weapon. Henry is then confronted by an ink version of Alice Angel, who briefly knocks him out before summoning him to her lair. Before entering, Henry must choose whether to take the Demon path or the Angel path; the other path will close once Henry makes his choice. Inside, Henry and Boris discover multiple mutilated clones of Boris and other ink monsters collectively called the Butcher Gang, which Alice has been harvesting to improve her appearance. Meeting Alice, who is torturing one of the monsters, Henry is instructed to complete missions from her in exchange for being allowed to escape the studio. Doing so, he recovers things such as gears, power cells, hearts, and globs of ink from Swollen Searchers as well as being instructed to destroy Bendy cutouts and protect Alice's lair from enemies, all the while being hunted by Bendy, Searchers, the Butcher Gang, and the Projectionist, a projector-headed ink corrupted version of Norman Polk, the studio's projectionist. Alice also provides Henry with tools to help him: a wrench, a syringe, an axe, a plunger, and a tommy gun (which can only be obtained if certain actions are taken). Over the course of this, it becomes apparent that Alice is actually Susie Campbell, the original voice actress for the cartoon Alice who became obsessed with Alice to the point of believing she was her character, and grew vindictive after she was replaced by another actress, Allison Pendle; she has since taken Alice's form after being corrupted by the ink. After fulfilling her needs, she sends him to the elevator where he can leave, but forces the elevator to fall after discovering Boris, whom she wants to harvest as he is the most perfect Boris. The elevator crashes, knocking Henry out; as Boris tries to wake Henry up, Alice kidnaps Boris and takes him away.

Chapter 4: Colossal Wonders 
Waking back up from passing out and Boris’ abduction, Henry leaves the broken lift and explores the cavernous archives of the studio to find and rescue Boris. After Alice taunts Henry over loudspeakers about Boris' capture, Henry comes across a lounge filled with Lost Ones, people infected by the ink who show no hostility. After fleeing through the vents, Henry discovers that Joey planned to open a Bendy-themed amusement park called Bendy Land, with the help of famed amusement park designer Bertrum Piedmont. Henry deduces that the haunted house attraction is the way to go and traverses the storage area to find the switches to power the ride up. He activates the four power switches, while in the process sneaking past the Butcher Gang by throwing empty cans, defeating an ink corrupted Bertrum, who has merged himself with an octopus ride, and escaping from the Projectionist, who is decapitated by Bendy and takes his body away. Once on the haunted house ride, Henry is shocked to discover that Alice has transformed Boris into a brute monster. Unable to turn him back to normal, Henry is forced to kill Boris, who fades away. An enraged Alice tries to attack and kill Henry herself, but is killed from behind by another version of Alice Angel and a robot-handed clone of Boris.

Chapter 5: The Last Reel 
The new Alice and Boris, dubbed Allison Angel (Allison Pendle) and Tom (Thomas Conner, the lead engineer of the Ink Machine), lock Henry in a makeshift prison, as they aren't sure if they can trust him. Henry manages to gain Allison's trust, and she gives Henry a Seeing Tool, which is used to see hidden messages; Henry sees a message that says Allison will leave Henry for dead (which is later proven true).

Later, Bendy discovers Allison and Tom's location, and Tom (still distrusting Henry) convinces Allison to leave Henry behind so they can escape, knowing that they can't get him out before Bendy arrives. Henry manages to escape the prison on his own after discovering a secret room with a weapon behind the wall, thanks to the hidden messages. Once he escapes, Henry sees Allison and Tom escaping on a barge through a river of ink. He follows them on a second barge, with a massive Bendy hand chasing behind him. Henry arrives in a shanty town built by the Searchers and the Lost Ones. There, he is confronted by an injured Sammy, who deliriously believes Henry is Bendy and tries to take revenge for almost killing him. Sammy overpowers Henry and tries to kill him, but is killed by Tom, who finally trusts Henry and equips him with an axe. With Sammy out of the way, the Searchers and Lost Ones he was keeping at bay become violent and start attacking. Henry, Allison, and Tom work together and defeat the wave of monsters. Henry leads the way onward, but falls into the administration offices on a lower level. Henry tries to escape through the film vault, but the entrance is flooded. He works to reconnect the pipe system to drain the ink, all while hiding from the Butcher Gang.

Once in the film vault, a message reveals that a film reel has been stolen by Bendy. Allison and Tom arrive and join Henry on his quest to find Bendy. They discover that Bendy's lair is a massive version of the Ink Machine. Henry is forced to go in alone, as the entrance is surrounded by ink, which could reabsorb and kill Allison and Tom. Inside, Henry finds a message from Joey, who talks about his downfall and how Henry can fix the darkness by showing Bendy the stolen reel, titled "The End". It's revealed that the Ink Machine was used in a combination of occult magic and technological alchemy to create real-life mascots for Bendy Land, but Bendy was abandoned in the depths of the studio, as unlike the other creations, which are made from the souls of the staff, he was made from scratch and soulless as a result, locked away in a prison-like throne room filled with cartoons in a vain attempt to imprint the desired traits onto him. Bendy arrives and transforms into a massive monster, known as Beast Bendy, knocking Henry into another room and giving chase. Henry escapes Bendy and returns to his throne to play "The End" reel, which broadcasts the words "The End" on several screens, causing Bendy to dissolve as his story comes to a close.

Afterwards, Henry is transported to Joey's house, who talks about how the two went on different paths, and how Joey's path burned because of his ambition. He summons Henry to the studio and the events of the beginning of the game play again, revealing that Henry is caught in a time loop called the Cycle.

In a post-credits scene, the camera zooms in on a signed picture from Henry of Bendy, Boris and Alice Angel. Offscreen, a young girl (implied to be Joey's niece) asks her "Uncle Joey" to tell her another story.

Characters and voice cast

 Henry Stein (voiced by theMeatly) is a co-founder and animator of Joey Drew Studios, who created the characters in the Bendy cartoons. He is the main protagonist of the game, who has returned to Joey Drew Studios after 30 years.
 Joey Drew (voiced by David Eddings) is a co-founder and CEO of Joey Drew Studios. Prior to the games events, Joey went bankrupt. He is the presumed overarching antagonist of the game. 
 Wally Franks (voiced by theMeatly) is Joey Drew Studios' relaxed janitor. Besides Henry, he is the only character to appear in all 5 chapters. He is most known for his phrase "I'm outta here!"
 Thomas Connor (voiced by Mike Mood) is a mechanical engineer from Gent Enterprises who was hired by Joey Drew Studios to build the Ink Machine. In the game, he has been corrupted by the ink and turned into a Boris clone, who goes by Tom.
 Sammy Lawrence (voiced by Aaron Landon) is the former music director of Joey Drew Studios, who started to go insane. By the events of the game, he has been corrupted by the ink and worships Bendy as a deity.
 Norman Polk (voiced by theMeatly) is the elusive and observant projectionist of Joey Drew Studios. By the events of the game, he has been turned into the Projectionist monster. 
 Susie Campbell (voiced by Alanna Linayre) is the original voice actress for Alice Angel, who became obsessed with the character, and went crazy when she was replaced by Allison Pendle.  By the events of the game, she has been corrupted by the ink and turned into a twisted version of Alice.
 Alice Angel (voiced by Lauren Synger) is the lead female in the Bendy cartoons. In the game, she is a twisted form of the original character, taken form through Susie Campbell.
 Jack Fain (voiced by Bookpast) is the main lyricist at Joey Drew Studios and Sammy's second-in-command. In the game, he has been corrupted by the ink and transformed into a Swollen Searcher. 
 Shawn Flynn (voiced by Seán "Jacksepticeye" McLoughlin) is the merchandise director at Joey Drew Studios.
 Grant Cohen (voiced by Will Alex "DAGames" Ryan) is Joey Drew's exasperated accountant. 
 Bertrum Piedmont (voiced by Joe J. Thomas) is a famed theme park designer, who built the Bendy-themed amusement park, Bendy Land and rejects his treatment by Joey Drew. In the game, he has merged with an octopus ride.
 Lacie Benton (voiced by Lani Minella) is an engineer working under Bertrum Piedmont.
 Allison Pendle (voiced by Lauren Synger) is the second voice actress for Alice Angel, replacing Susie Campbell. In the game, she has been corrupted by the ink and transformed into Allison Angel.

Additionally, there are multiple characters in the game with no featured dialogue:
 Ink Bendy is a vicious and deformed version of Bendy, the main character of the Bendy cartoons. He is known by the ink residents as the Ink Demon.
 Boris the Wolf / Buddy Boris is a secondary character in the Bendy cartoons. In the game, a friendly version of him appears as Henry's companion, before he is transformed into Brute Boris by Alice. Additionally, multiple clones of Boris appear throughout the game as mutilated corpses.
 The Butcher Gang are a trio from the Bendy cartoons, who are always at odds with Bendy. In the game, they appear as the Piper (Charley), the Fisher (Barley) and the Striker (Edgar).
 The Searchers are a group of humanoid ink creatures who attack Henry throughout the game.
 The Lost Ones are employees of Joey Drew Studios, who have been corrupted by the ink, and aren't hostile. A specific Lost One is voiced by Joe J. Thomas.
 The Swollen Searchers are enlarged and passive forms of the Searchers. They are notable for being a source of ink throughout the game.

Development
The idea for Bendy and the Ink Machine came from theMeatly pondering the idea of a world that resembled a cartoon sketch. As he started developing the idea, he realized that it felt "creepy" and needed a monster that inhabited it. Bendy was created to be that monster, but did not have a name. When the character finally received a 3D model, the name was chosen from a typo while saving it in a 3D modeling program, Blender. theMeatly was not a programmer and thus Mike Mood joined the production as he saw potential in the game. Bendy and the Ink Machine was inspired by the BioShock series.

The first chapter, "Moving Pictures", took five days to be finished. The game was then released for free on Game Jolt on February 10, 2017, being one of the first games that were released on the platform. Originally, the project was "for fun", according to Mood, but it later became viral and incentivated then to develop a second chapter, "The Old Song", which was officially announced in March 2017 and took six weeks to be finished. It was released on April 18, 2017, and also added a remastered version of the previous chapter, an updated menu, subtitles, achievements, etc. The game was approved by Steam Greenlight on February 28, 2017, and was then released on Steam on April 27, 2017. "Chapter 1" was made available for free, while "Chapter 2" was released as a DLC for $6 dollars.

The third chapter, "Rise and Fall", was announced on production in May 2017. It was developed by six people in at least four months, and the reason for its long development, according to Mike Mood, was because he needed to create a framework "to make the process smoother". Its trailer was released in August 2017, which showed an animated short intitled "Tombstone Picnic" and showed Henry running from Ink Bendy in a room. However, Mike Mood stated it was used only for the trailer's chase sequence and for test purposes. It was released on September 28, 2017, while the previous two chapters also received remastered versions.

The fourth chapter, "Colossal Wonders", was firstly confirmed in production on November 17, 2017. It also included remastered versions of the first three chapters, which included enhanced soundtracks and textures. It was released on April 30, 2018. Originally scheduled for April 28, 2018, it was delayed due to technical problems on Steam that disallows to make releases during weekends. The fifth and final chapter, "The Last Reel", was firstly confirmed in production on June 4, 2018. Later, they confirmed that it would be released in October. The emprise also confirmed that the chapter would be received for free for only players who have bought the previous chapters. A special edition titled Bendy and the Ink Machine: Jacksepticeye Edition, was given to YouTuber Jacksepticeye before the fifth chapter released to the public, which included all five chapters. It was released on October 26, 2018. The game received a final bundle on the next day, titled Bendy and the Ink Machine: Complete Edition. Chapters 2-4, which were previously available as downloadable content, became free, while the game became paid.

On January 29, 2018, theMeatly officially announced that Bendy and the Ink Machine would be released to consoles. The PlayStation 4 and Xbox One ports were developed and published by Rooster Teeth Games, originally intended to be released on October 26, 2018, while the Nintendo Switch port was scheduled to release on November 20, 2018, but both PlayStation 4 and Xbox One's release dates were pushed to the same date for Nintendo Switch's release. On December 15, 2018, a mobile port was announced by theMeatly and Joey Drew Studios Inc., and it was released on December 21, 2018.

Reception

According to the aggregating review website Metacritic, Bendy and the Ink Machine received "mixed or average reviews" on its console ports. The website Rock, Paper, Shotgun considered the first chapter one of the best free games from the week.

The game's storyline and setting were mostly praised. Most reviewers noted that the game's art style resembles the "Steamboat Willie" era of Disney's cartoons, with PlayStation LifeStyle considering Bendy as an "obvious parallel" between other cartoon characters such as Mickey Mouse or Betty Boop. Liam Martin of Express considered that the game's theme to be that "classic cartoons are more sinister than we remember". Sean Warhurst of ImpulseGamer also considered the game's visuals as the game's "biggest strength" and that its graphics engine "complements the artistic direction". This was also considered by Barry Stevens of Entertainment Focus, considering that "the game has a really unique art style and really pulls off the old animation studio feel with everything being drawn in a 30s style".

Most websites considered the game's gameplay mechanics repetitive. TheXboxHub considered the game's combat mechanics "frustrating", as most of its enemies die in only one hit. VGCultureHQ considered that if would have some range weapons in the second chapter, such as a gun or a slingshot, "would help make lengthy combat sequences feel more fair and less of a risk". However, it also stated that the boss battles in the game feel "intense". The puzzles, according to The Digital Fix, were considered repetitive, saying that "It's something we've done a million times before".

VGCultureHQ considered the game's chapter lengths "too short" and without a "fair balance", considering that it could be completed in four hours, considering that the first and final chapters could be "finished in just under a half-hour", while the other three chapters "may take longer". According to Hely on Horror, the first chapter serves as a "tutorial", as guides the player to "interact with the environment and solve simple puzzles", the second chapter is where combat is introduced, but it considered that the third chapter is where players are thrown into the action. Steven Asarch of Player.One considered the third chapter's task list as a "lazy attempt for developers to pad the game without adding any additional content", and that if future chapters could focus more on the characters development, "they could've truly be masterpieces".

The game has been frequently compared with BioShock, due to, according to PlayStation LifeStyle, the game having an "antique style". Nintendo Life also considered the motives of having a BioShock vibe in the game due to "the revelations that are made of Henry's past to the retro aesthetic that clings to every corner of the game's dilapidated setting". However, it also compared it to Resident Evil, and Outlast, considering it a "fusion". The game was also compared with Cuphead and Epic Mickey, for their homages to "rubber hose" animation and the style of 20th-century cartoons.

Sales 
By 2017, the game achieved 750,000 downloads on Steam, according to Player.One.

Awards 
The game has received the "Best Horror Game" award by IGN and is listed as #1 in "18 Best Horror Games of 2017". The mobile port received the "Game of the Day" award on February 23, 2019. TouchArcade nominated the mobile port as the "Game of the Week" on December 21, 2018.

Legacy 

YouTube was a big contributor for the popularity of Bendy and the Ink Machine. Many gamers such as Markiplier and Jacksepticeye were seen making "Let's Play" videos of Bendy and the Ink Machine, which reached millions of views. Many YouTube musicians also made fan songs for Bendy and the Ink Machine, the most popular being DAGames' "Build Our Machine", which has been viewed more than 100 million times. Some of the most popular fanmade songs were later included in an album entitled "Bendy's Inky Megamix", which was made to help raise donations for United Ways COVID-19 relief charity at Tiltify. Some of these fan-made songs were included in the game, including DAGames' "Build Our Machine", Kyle Allen's "Bendy and the Ink Machine Song", Random Encounters' "Bendy and the Ink Musical", and JT Music's "Can't Be Erased".

This caused the game to have a giant fanbase, which Mood described as different from the most fanbases, calling other games' fanbases sometimes "toxic". The game also attracted an audience of children, whose attention was mostly given to the character Bendy, although the game is T-rated. According to Mike Mood, what the made the game so popular was because of its characters.

It also surged merchandise from the game, such as toys, shirts, etc., which can be bought on the game's official store. Books and comic books were also released.

Spin-offs 
A mobile spin-off called Bendy in Nightmare Run was announced on January 26, 2018. It was released on the App Store on August 15, 2018 and on the Google Play Store on September 27, 2018. The game is an endless runner style game involving the player characters of either Bendy, Boris, or Alice collecting Bacon Soup while running away from large bosses chasing the player character.

A spin-off called Boris and the Dark Survival was released on February 10, 2020, on Bendy and the Ink Machines 3-year anniversary. The game is a prequel, taking place before the first chapter of the original game. It revolves around Boris the Wolf searching through the different levels of Joey Drew Studios looking for supplies for his safehouse while escaping Ink Bendy, Twisted Alice, the Projectionist, the Butcher Gang, or Borkis, a yellow-eyed version of Boris. The game also received several updates after its release. The latest one, Symphony of Shadows, was released on June 30, 2020.

Joke games 
On October 23, 2018, Joey Drew Studios posted on Twitter an image announcing a joke game, entitled Black Ink Possession, parodying Red Dead Redemption 2. During April Fools in 2020, the emprise poster a trailer of another joke game, Bendy Royale. It parodies Fortnite: Battle Royale, where it was meant to be a battle royale with Bendy and the Ink Machine characters being playable.

Crossovers 
A Halloween crossover mod, Hello Bendy, was released for the game on October 27, 2017, for a limited time, featuring the Hello Neighbor antagonist, who takes the role as Bendy in all previous three chapters and Sammy Lawrence for Chapter 2. The mod's menu features the advertisement of pre-ordering the game Hello Neighbor. The mod expired by the end of October that year.

Co-creator Mike Mood has talked about wanting to do a crossover with Cuphead, which also was popular at around the same time and also uses rubber hose animation.

Bendy and the Dark Revival 
Another game, Bendy and the Dark Revival, was announced on April 14, 2019. However, Mike Mood stated on February 13, 2019 that it would not serve as Bendy and the Ink Machine 2. A gameplay trailer was released on June 24, 2019, announcing the game's release for Fall 2019. However, in December 2019, a new trailer was released to say that the game was being delayed and will release sometime in 2020. Another trailer was released on June 1, 2020, revealing that the game would be released in its entirety with all five chapters included, unlike the first game which was released episodically. The trailer also suggested the game would come out in the latter half of 2020. However, on November 30, 2020, the developers announced that the game would be releasing in 2021, due to the COVID-19 pandemic. The developers also cited that the game will be ten times bigger than the original game and that they didn't want to rush the game. The game was, however, delayed once again to 2022 without being announced. On October 31, 2022, the official Bendy social media accounts announced that a trailer for Bendy and the Dark Revival would be uploaded the following day. The game was officially released on November 15, 2022.

Television adaptation 
In 2020, Derek Kolstad, creator of the John Wick franchise, stated that he has interest in making a television adaptation based on the game.

Notes

References

External links

 

2017 video games
2018 video games
2019 video games
Android (operating system) games
Episodic video games
First-person video games
2010s horror video games
IOS games
Indie video games
Linux games
MacOS games
Monochrome video games
Nintendo Switch games
PlayStation 4 games
Single-player video games
Video games about demons
Video games developed in Canada
Video games set in 1963
Video games set in New York City
Windows games
Works about missing people
Xbox One games
Internet memes introduced in 2017